Jasmine Crowe is an American singer, songwriter, musician, and music producer.  Her single, Chess Game charted at #28 on Billboard's Dance Club chart and her single Breaking Things won Song of the Year in the John Lennon Songwriting Contest.  Her music has been featured on Temptation Island and Ghosted: Love Gone Missing.

Early life
Jasmine Miranda Crowe was born in Hilo, Hawaii to parents Richard and Debra Crowe. Her father was an accomplished pianist and astronomer.  She began playing the violin at three years old, attending Young Music Studio and was a violinist in the Orchid Isle Youth Orchestra.  Crowe learned to sing while listening to Broadway musical recordings and eventually started performing locally.  She began writing songs and learning music production as a teenager and is self-taught on the piano, guitar, and ukulele.

Career
Crowe began playing music in Hawaii and moved to Los Angeles to pursue a professional music career.  Her single, Lightning In A Bottle won first place (Pop Category) in the UK Songwriting Competition in 2016 and in 2018, she was the Grand Prize Winner of the John Lennon Songwriting Contest for her single, Breaking Things.  The prize was presented to her by Ringo Starr.

Her debut album, Symptoms, released in 2019 received favorable reviews. The album's single Chess Game charted at #28 on Billboard's Dance Chart and additional singles were featured on Temptation Island and Ghosted: Love Gone Missing.

Crowe cites musical influences as Lady Gaga, Sia, Jewel, Alanis Morissette, and Taylor Swift. She has performed at the Whisky a Go Go, the Hotel Café, the Mint, and Jam in the Van, among other venues.
 
In 2021, Crowe was the Viewer's Choice Winner (Best Female Solo Artist) for her music video, Sky is Falling at the California Music Video Awards. Her Pride anthem, Love is Love received the Social Justice Award the following year and charted at #32 on the LGBTQ UK Music Chart in 2022.

Crowe was formerly in the music duo BLVCKBOW, with Brittni Paiva.

References

American singer-songwriters
21st-century American women musicians
Singers from Hawaii
American record producers
Living people
Year of birth missing (living people)